Posey Creek Station of the Butterfield Overland Mail 1st Division was located on Posey or Poso Creek, in the southeastern San Joaquin Valley, in present-day Kern County, California.

History
The station was at the site of the earlier Depot Camp on Posey Creek, established by the 1853 Pacific Railroad Survey Expedition of the U. S. Army led by  Lieutenant Robert Stockton Williamson.  It was a stopping place on the Stockton - Los Angeles Road.

Landmark
The California Historical Landmark Marker Number 539 at the intersection is seen on the left when traveling south on Glennville-Bakersfield/Granite Road.

California Historical Landmark Marker reads:
NO. 539 POSEY STATION OF BUTTERFIELD OVERLAND MAIL LINES - Two and one-half miles east of this point stood the Posey Station on the Butterfield Overland Stage route that ran from St. Louis, Missouri through present-day Kern County to San Francisco during 1858-61, until the outbreak of the Civil War.

See also
Butterfield Overland Mail in California
 California Historical Landmarks in Kern County
California Historical Landmark

References

External links
  Posey Station of Butterfield Overland Mail Lines Shows photos of the base of the missing Marker #539.

Butterfield Overland Mail in California
Former settlements in Kern County, California
California Historical Landmarks
History of Kern County, California
Stagecoach stations in California
Transportation buildings and structures in Kern County, California